Ragdoll Productions is a British television production company founded in 1984 by Anne Wood, who had previously worked for Yorkshire Television and TV-am. It is located in Stratford-upon-Avon, and has produced a number of children's programmes, most notably Pob's Programme, Teletubbies, Rosie and Jim, Brum, Boohbah, Tots TV, and In the Night Garden....

History
In the United States, Ragdoll sold their programs through The Itsy Bitsy Entertainment Company, but in October 2001, Ragdoll parted ways with the company following a failure to reach an agreement with Itsy Bitsy's majority owner, the Handleman Group. Ragdoll then began to sell their programmes on their own from then-on.

In January 2002, Teletubbies Everywhere, a spin-off of the Teletubbies, was announced to air on CBeebies within its launch window. On June 14, a new series titled Boohbah was announced, and was pre-sold to CITV and GMTV for a 2003 delivery. The show later saw an international roll-out.

At MIPTV 2005, Ragdoll announced a new show titled Blurrfect and that CITV had acquired broadcasting rights. The show would premiere in Autumn 2005. By September 2005, the show was renamed Blips, and soon premiered on 29 September 2005 as part of the CITV's autumn schedule. On 13 October Ragdoll unrevealed two new series that were pre-sold to the BBC: In the Night Garden..., and Tronji, for a 2007 delivery. In October 2005, Ragdoll subsidiary The Ragdoll Foundation announced that Five's Milkshake! block had commissioned a series of six short films titled What Makes Me Happy?, which would air daily from 19 December.

In September 2006, Ragdoll formed a joint venture with BBC Worldwide called Ragdoll Worldwide, to sell and license the company's programs outside of the UK and North America. In the Night Garden and Tronji would be the first two programmes created as part of the venture, while existing programmes would be handled by BBC Worldwide will manage the international broadcast sales and the UK and international licensing of all Ragdoll properties (Blips, Boohbah, Brum, Tots TV, Rosie and Jim, and Open a Door), with Ragdoll retaining all UK broadcast rights. A new subsidiary - Ragdoll USA Inc, part of the new joint venture, would manage Ragdoll's distribution in North America.

In January 2013, Ragdoll opted to end their agreement with BBC Worldwide and put up Ragdoll Worldwide for sale. On 16 September DHX Media purchased the venture from both companies for £17.4 million (or USD$24 million) The deal included the rights to Ragdoll's programming, but did not include the rights to Pob's Programme and Playbox, which were kept by Ragdoll Ltd., not the Ragdoll Productions company itself.

In 2021, Ragdoll formed a deal with British distribution company Cake Entertainment for them to distribute their new series, B.O.T. and the Beasties, for CBeebies.

Pre-Ragdoll productions 
The following are some of Ragdoll's productions before the company was founded, accompanied by a brief description and vital statistics:

 Puzzle Party - first broadcast in 1977. Hosted by Gyles Brandreth and featuring characters Gnigel and Gnu, the show was one of Anne Wood's earliest TV shows for BBC.
 The Book Tower - first broadcast in 1979, hosted by Tom Baker and Stephen Moore.
 Ragdolly Anna - first broadcast in 1982, based on the children's books by Jean Kenward.
 Roland Rat - first broadcast in 1983.

Ragdoll's productions
All of the following shows (except Pob's Programme, Playbox, Storytime, and B.O.T. and the Beasties) are now owned by WildBrain (formerly DHX Media). Tots TV is co-owned with ITV plc.

 Pob's Programme (1985–1990) on Channel 4
 Playbox (1987–1992) on ITV
 The Magic Mirror (1989)
 Boom! (1990-1991)
 Storytime (Series 5-6) (1990) on BBC2
 Rosie and Jim (1990–2000) on ITV
 Brum (1991-2002) on BBC1 (Children's BBC, 2001-2002 series on CBeebies)
 Tots TV (1993–1998) on ITV (Children's ITV)
 Open a Door (1994–2003) on BBC1 (Children's BBC, later CBeebies)
 Teletubbies (Original Series) (1997–2001) on BBC2 (Children's BBC)
 Badjelly the Witch (2000) on BBC One (CBBC)
 Teletubbies Everywhere (2002) on CBeebies
 Boohbah (2003–2006) on ITV1 (CITV)
 Blips (2005–2006) on ITV1 (CITV)
 What Makes Me Happy (2005) on Five (Milkshake!)
 In the Night Garden... (2007–2009) on CBeebies
 Tronji (2009–2010) on CBBC
 Dipdap (2011) on CBeebies
 The Adventures of Abney & Teal (2011–2012) on CBeebies
 Twirlywoos (2015–2017)
 B.O.T. and the Beasties (2021–present) on CBeebies

The Ragdoll Shop 
The Ragdoll Shop in Stratford-upon-Avon in Warwickshire was a shop that consisted of themed play areas based on Ragdoll properties and an area where merchandise was sold. The store originally opened in 1992, and traded until 2005, due to expansion limits and failure to find a new larger venue.

The building that formerly housed the shop is now a optometrist's practice named Dr. CP Grey's. The picture of Rosie and Jim waving can still be seen in the black window at the top of the building.

References

External links 
Ragdoll's Website
History of Ragdoll

WildBrain
British animation studios
Television production companies of the United Kingdom
Mass media in Warwickshire
Mass media companies established in 1984
Companies based in Warwickshire
1984 establishments in the United Kingdom